David Beckett (born 25 October 1954) is a former English cricketer.

Beckett was born at Oxford, and debuted for Oxfordshire in minor counties cricket in the 1976 Minor Counties Championship against Buckinghamshire. He played minor counties cricket for Oxfordshire until 1980, having made eighteen appearances in the Minor Counties Championship. During his time at Oxfordshire, Beckett also made a single appearance in List A one-day cricket against the first-class county Warwickshire in the 1980 Gillette Cup at Edgbaston. He later made two appearances in the Minor Counties Championship for Devon in 1986.

References

External links

1954 births
Living people
Cricketers from Oxford
English cricketers
Oxfordshire cricketers
Devon cricketers